P. armeniaca may refer to:
 Phlomis armeniaca, a herbaceous plant species found in Turkey
 Pireneitega armeniaca, a spider species in the genus Pireneitega
 Pleurothallis armeniaca, an orchid species in the genus Pleurothallis
 Prunus armeniaca, the apricot tree, a plant species

See also
 Armeniaca (disambiguation)